(fl. 1822–1830) was a Japanese ukiyo-e woodblock print artist active in the Osaka area during the first half of the nineteenth century. He was a member of the Shunkōsai Fukushū school of artists, and studied under .

Kamigata-e were predominantly  images of kabuki actors, and were produced almost exclusively by amateur “talented kabuki fans” promoting their favourite actors rather than professional print designers.

Works
Hokuchō was not a prolific artist and few prints attributed to him survive. Many of his prints are characterized by yellow backgrounds, and all of these images are yakusha-e kabuki actor portraits.

He regularly worked with Kasuke, one of the most esteemed woodblock carvers of the period.

Modern art historians and critics have not been overly impressed with Hokuchō's skill, describing him as "competent but limited", and less talented than his mentor, Hokushū.

Collections
Works by Shunshosai Hokuchō belong to the permanent collections of various international museums including the following:
 Asian Art Museum
 Museum of Applied Arts, Vienna
 Cleveland Museum of Art
 Museum of Fine Arts, Boston
 Ritsumeikan University [立命館大学]
 Royal Ontario Museum
 Tokyo Municipal Library [東京都立図書館] 
 Waseda University Tsubouchi Memorial Theatre Museum [演劇博物館]
 V & A Museum

See also
 Ryūsai Shigeharu - kamigata-e artist
 Utagawa Kunimasu - kamigata-e artist
 Konishi Hirosada - kamigata-e artist
 Yoshida Hanbei - kamigata-e artist
 Actor Ichikawa Ebijūrō as Samurai (Shunshosai Hokuchō) - print by Hokuchō

Notes

External links

References
 

 

 

 

 

 

 

 

 

Ukiyo-e artists
19th-century Japanese artists